Carlene Ang Aguilar-Ocampo (born February 8, 1982) is a Filipino-Chinese actress and former beauty queen, having been crowned Miss Philippines Earth 2001 and Binibining Pilipinas World 2005.

Biography
Carlene Aguilar was born on February 8, 1982, to Raul Aguilar and Catharin Ang. She has two brothers and a sister, all raised in the heart of Quezon City, Philippines. Aguilar studied at the Immaculate Conception Academy-Greenhills for her elementary and high school education. She majored in Art Studies at the University of the Philippines Diliman.

She has a previous relationship with Dennis Trillo, wherein she had a son, Calix Andreas.

Aguilar is currently married to Yo Ocampo, where she had two children, namely Marcus and Hunter.

Career

Pageants
Aguilar won the title of Miss Philippines Earth 2001 and became the country's representative to Miss Earth 2001, where she placed in Top 10 and won special award Best in Evening Gown. In 2004, she became Miss Chinatown Manila and subsequently became a 2nd runner-up at Miss Chinese International. In 2005, at the Binibining Pilipinas pageant, Aguilar was crowned as Binibining Pilipinas World. She was also named Miss Philippine Airlines and Miss Avon. Aguilar was also a semi-finalist at Miss World 2005 in Sanya, China.

Aguilar is the first woman to represent the Philippines in two major international pageant competitions, namely Miss Earth (2001) and Miss World (2005).

Actress
Aguilar went into acting, having had a previous performance contract with Hong Kong's TVB Network, where she stayed for a few months.

Aguilar was a dancing contestant on the ABS-CBN show U Can Dance. Billed as a "beauty titlist" in the Filipino version of Dancing With The Stars, her partner was professional dancer Dindo Divinagracia.

She became a contestant in the second Philippine edition of Celebrity Duets but was eliminated before the finals on October 25, 2008.

She was in the 34th Metro Manila Film Festival movie entry, Iskul Bukol: 20 Years After, opposite Tito Sotto, Vic Sotto and Joey de Leon.

In early 2009, Aguilar played Clarisse Morales in Ang Babaeng Hinugot Sa Aking Tadyang in which she worked with Angelu de Leon. She made a guest appearance on GMA Network's talk show Cool Center. Aguilar played Rodora in Rosalinda, starring Carla Abellana and Geoff Eigenmann, and as Gilma in MariMar.

Covergirl
Aguilar was the covergirl for the January 2009 edition of FHM Philippines Magazine.

Filmography

Television

Online series

Film

References

External links
 (video) Dennis Trillo now friends with Cristina Reyes, Carlene Aguilar - 21 January 2008

1982 births
Living people
Filipino people of Chinese descent
Miss World 2005 delegates
Miss Earth 2001 contestants
Participants in Philippine reality television series
Star Magic personalities
Filipino television actresses
Miss Philippines Earth winners
Binibining Pilipinas winners
People from Quezon City
Actresses from Metro Manila
University of the Philippines Diliman alumni